Springfield is a city in Bay County, Florida, United States, east of Panama City.  The population was 8,903 at the 2010 census. It is part of the Panama City–Lynn Haven–Panama City Beach Metropolitan Statistical Area. Springfield was incorporated on February 12, 1935.

Unlike much of Bay County, Springfield has been mostly left out of the recent real estate boom, possibly due to the large and odoriferous chemical plant and paper mill on the city's waterfront.

Geography

Springfield is located at  (30.165451, –85.610525).

Demographics

At the 2010 census there were 8,903 people in 3,478 households, including 2,209 families, in the city. The population density was 2,070.5  inhabitants per square mile (794.9/km). The racial makeup of the city was 66.0%  White, 23.8% African American, 0.7% American Indian or Alaska Native, 3.8% Asian, 0.1% Native Hawaiian or other Pacific Islander, 1.9% some other race, and 3.8% from two or more races. Hispanic or Latino of any race were 5.8%.

There were 3,478 households, 27.9% had children under the age of 18 living with them, 37.8% were headed by married couples living together, 19.6% had a female householder with no husband present, and 36.5% were non-families. 28.8% of households were made up of individuals, and 8.9% were someone living alone who was 65 or older.  The average household size was 2.52, and the average family size was 3.07.

The age distribution was 24.6% under the age of 18, 11.2% from 18 to 24, 26.5% from 25 to 44, 24.6% from 45 to 64, and 13.0% 65 or older.  The median age was 34.9 years. For every 100 females, there were 97.5 males.  For every 100 females age 18 and over, there were 96.7 males.

At the 2012 census, the median household income was $36,693. The per capita income for the city was $18,001. About 15.3% of families and 21.5% of the population were below the poverty line, including 29.7% of those under age 18 and 15.1% of those age 65 or over.

Education
Springfield is home to Rutherford High School, Everitt Middle School, Springfield Elementary School, and Shaw Adult Learning Center. The city is part of the Bay County School District.

References

External links
City of Springfield, FL

Cities in Bay County, Florida
Populated places established in 1935
Cities in Florida
1935 establishments in Florida